Mr. Rock 'n' Roll: The Alan Freed Story is a 1999 American television film directed by Andy Wolk and starring Judd Nelson as Alan Freed.  It is based on John A. Jackson's book Big Beat Heat: Alan Freed and the Early Years of Rock & Roll.

Cast
Judd Nelson as Alan Freed
Mädchen Amick as Jackie McCoy
David Gianopoulos as Morris Levy
Daniel Kash as Hooke
Leon Robinson as Jackie Wilson
Paula Abdul as Denise Walton
Fabian Forte
Bobby Rydell
James C. Victor as Jerry Lee Lewis
Walter Franks as Little Richard
Joe Warren Davis as Buddy Holly
Michael Dunston as Bo Diddley
LeRoy D. Brazile as Frankie Lymon
Fulvio Cecere as Pete Bell
Mark Wilson as Leo Mintz
Richard Fitzpatrick as VP Programming
Aron Tager as J. Edgar Hoover
Reg Dreger as Police Captain 
Bruce Hunter as Head Parent Shaw
Emidio Michetti as Director 
Egidio Tari as FBI Agent 
Robert Thomas as Bouncer
David Crean as Surgeon
Brittney Whalen as Siggy

Production
The film was shot in Toronto.

References

External links
 
 

1990s biographical films
Films based on non-fiction books
American biographical films
Films set in the 20th century
1999 films
1999 television films
Films shot in Toronto
Films directed by Andy Wolk
NBC network original films
1990s English-language films
1990s American films